Rytter is a surname. Notable people with the surname include:

Henrik Rytter (1877–1950), Norwegian dramatist, lyricist and translator
Jan Rytter (born 1973), Danish archer
Olav Rytter (1903–1992), Norwegian newspaper editor, radio personality, foreign correspondent, philologist and translator
Thomas Rytter (born 1974), Danish footballer and manager
Wojciech Rytter, Polish computer scientist